Our Lady of the Annunciation Church is a Catholic parish church next to Bishop Eton Monastery in Childwall, Liverpool. It was built from 1857 to 1858 by the Redemptorists and was designed by E. W. Pugin. It is on the Woolton Road, opposite the Hope Park campus of Liverpool Hope University and close to Our Lady's Bishop Eton Primary School. It is a Grade II* listed building.

History

Foundation
The building housing the Bishop Eton monastery was built in 1776. It was intended by its owner, Unitarian minister Hezekiah Kirkpatrick, to be a school that would rival Eton College. After the closure of the school, it became a private residence. In 1843, the building was bought for two Catholic priests and cousins James Sharples and George Brown. Sharples would become the bishop of the Apostolic Vicariate of the Lancashire District and Brown would become the first Catholic Bishop of Liverpool. As they were bishops, the building was called Bishops' Eton. They built a chapel next to the building. It was designed by Augustus Pugin. In 1851, after the death of Sharples a year earlier, the Redemptorists were invited to buy the house, and it became a community of Redemptorist priests, Bishop Eton Monastery.

Construction
In 1857 the Redemptorists replaced the chapel with Our Lady of the Annunciation Church. It was built from 1857 to 1858 and designed by Pugin's son, E. W. Pugin. In 1865 and 1866 further additions were made to the church. A high altar and tabernacle, both designed by John Francis Bentley, were installed. He also designed the pulpit and triptych, which was installed in 1889. The stained glass in the west window was designed by Charles Eamer Kempe. The stained glass in the north chapel depicting Our Lady of the Annunciation was made by Hardman & Co.

Developments
In 1961, the church became a parish church. In 1973 a fire destroyed part of the church. In 2011, the Redemptorists were asked to serve the nearby parish of St Mary's Church, Woolton, which they continue to do.

Parish
As the Redemptorists at Bishop Eton serve both parishes of St Mary's Church, Woolton and Our Lady of the Annunciation Church, the Masses at both do not happen at the same time. There is a Sunday Mass at 9:30am at Our Lady of the Annunciation Church and a Sunday Mass at 11:00am at St Mary's Church, Woolton.

The parish is also linked with the nearby Our Lady's Bishop Eton Primary School.

Exterior and grounds

See also
 Erdington Abbey
 Grade II* listed buildings in Liverpool – Suburbs

References

External links
 
 

Grade II* listed buildings in Liverpool
Grade II* listed churches in Merseyside
Roman Catholic churches in Liverpool
Gothic Revival church buildings in England
Gothic Revival architecture in Merseyside
Roman Catholic churches completed in 1858
19th-century Roman Catholic church buildings in the United Kingdom
Redemptorist churches in the United Kingdom